Tricholoma busuense is an agaric fungus of the genus Tricholoma. Found in Papua New Guinea, it was described as new to science in 1994 by English mycologist E.J.H. Corner.

See also
List of Tricholoma species

References

busuense
Fungi described in 1994
Fungi of New Guinea
Taxa named by E. J. H. Corner